Arocatus roeselii is a species of lygaeid bug.

Distribution
This species can be found in most of Europe, in the Middle East and Caucasus. It is not present in the British isles.

In 2008, it was reported in large numbers in London by the Natural History Museum, London, England, but the species was later identified as a related species, Arocatus longiceps, that has a more elongated head and generally a reddish body.

Habitat
These bugs preferably live under the bark of Alder or Sycamore.

Description

This species is very variable. The upperside of these bugs is red and black, while the abdomen is orange. Head, antennae, scutellum and legs are black. Connexivum is red. Hemelytral membrane is translucent, dark brown. The head length is about the same as the distance between the eyes.

Biology
Adult bugs are present all year around with several generations. They overwinter communally under bark. Mating takes place in May. The larvae develop in spring. The new generation adults at the beginning of the summer.

They feed on the seeds of Plane trees (genus Platanus), on alders (Alnus glutinosa, Alnus incana) and in other deciduous trees.

References

Lygaeidae
Hemiptera of Europe
Insects described in 1829